Marni Djurhuus (born 6 September 1985) is a Faroese retired football defender.

Club career
He mostly played for EB/Streymur, and made his debut match in the top league for EB/Streymur on 9 September 2001, this making him the youngest player ever to play in the top division.

In 2009, Djurhuus and EB/Streymur played in the UEFA Champions League Second qualifying round. They played against APOEL. The first match was played on 14 July 2009, the result was 0–2. The second match was played one week later, EB/Streymur lost 3–0.

International career
Djurhuus made his debut for the Faroe Islands national team on 7 October 2006 against Lithuania. 
The player announced his retirement from the national team before the match between Faroe Islands and France, on 13 October 2007, due to undisclosed personal issues. It is not known if this is a permanent retirement.

Djurhuus has also played for the Faroe Islands under-17 team. They played against Belarus on 26 September 2000. Belarus won 1–0.

Individual honours
 Effodeildin Best Defender: 2012
 Effodeildin Team of the Season: 2012

References

External links
 Marni Djurhuus at Faroe Soccer
 Portal.fo, Marni Djurhuus aftur í EB/Streymi (Faroese).

1985 births
Living people
Faroese footballers
Faroese expatriate footballers
EB/Streymur players
Vanløse IF players
Association football defenders
Faroe Islands international footballers
Expatriate men's footballers in Denmark